Bad Habit is the second studio album recorded by Canadian singer and songwriter Alee and first to be distributed by a record label. It was released April 21, 2017 through Wax Records and Universal Music Canada. The album includes the top 50 single, "When I Do", as well as three singles previously released from Alee's 2015 EP, Say Hello to Goodbye. Alee co-wrote all nine tracks.

Critical reception
RJ Frometa of Vents Magazine wrote that Bad Habit "runs the emotional gamut from bold and energetic crowd pleasers to Alee's signature blend of sweet but heartbreaking melodies," and called the album "an ambitious and impressive debut."

Singles
"Only the Strong Survive" was released as the lead single from both Bad Habit and Say Hello to Goodbye on October 14, 2014. It reached 32 on the Canada Country airplay chart.

A second single, "Moonshine", was released April 21, 2015. It received generally positive reviews from critics. The song became Alee's first top 20 hit on the Canadian country chart.

"Are You Alone" was initially released to radio August 1, 2016 as the fourth single from Say Hello to Goodbye; it also serves as the third single from Bad Habit.

"When I Do" was released January 27, 2017 as the record's fourth single. It is the album's first single not previously released on the preceding EP. The music video for "When I Do" premiered April 5, 2017 accompanying the announcement of the album's title and release date. The song entered the Canada Country chart at number 50 in April 2017.

The title track, "Bad Habit", was released June 16, 2017 as the fifth radio single.

Track listing

Chart performance

Singles

References

External links
 Bad Habit at AllMusic

2017 albums
Universal Records albums